Conecuh County School District  is a school district in Conecuh County, Alabama.

External links
 

School districts in Alabama
Education in Conecuh County, Alabama